Shahpur is a village in Chinhat block of Lucknow district, Uttar Pradesh, India. It is part of Lucknow tehsil. As of 2011, its population is 1,554, in 285 households. It is now part of Lucknow city.

References 

Villages in Lucknow district